Soylu is a Turkish surname. Notable people with the surname include:

İpek Soylu (born 1996), Turkish female tennis player
Seyhan Soylu (born 1988), director of Turkish television channel Kanal T
Süleyman Soylu (born 1969), Turkish politician
 Soylu, Hani

 
Turkish-language surnames

de:Soylu